Robert Trebor (born June 7, 1953) is an American character actor, perhaps best known for starring as Salmoneus on the cult hits Hercules: The Legendary Journeys and Xena: Warrior Princess. The surname of his stage name (Trebor) is an anadrome of his given name, Robert.

Biography

Early life
Trebor was born Robert Schenkman and grew up in Northeast Philadelphia; he is of Jewish origin. He first showed signs of interest in acting around age 13. He was soon taking acting classes and participating in local theater groups. He also won several filmmaking awards from Kodak short film competitions, and the local ABC Philadelphia and PBS affiliates for a short black and white film called "Communicate!?"

Starring Himself
He wrote, directed, and starred in this short, as well as composed the music on an early version of a Moog synthesizer. His first lead role on the stage was as Finch in How to Succeed in Business Without Really Trying for the St. Joseph's Summer Music Theatre Festival. Along with his acting Robert won several national awards from Scholastic Magazines for writing film and theatre reviews. Ironically one of his award-winning reviews was for John Frankenheimer's The Fixer. Years later he would appear in Frankenheimer's 1986 film 52 Pick-Up. After a brief focus on oratory, he returned to acting, majoring in theater at Northwestern University. He returned to Philadelphia to star with Bill Irwin in a revival of George Gershwin's Strike Up The Band for the inaugural season of the American Music Theatre Festival at the historic Walnut Street Theatre.
Trebor has since alternated between film and television.

Film and television
Trebor played the Son of Sam killer in Out of the Darkness opposite Martin Sheen.
On television, after playing Waylin the slave in Hercules and the Lost Kingdom, the second of five TV movies, Trebor rose to fame for playing the ever-out-to-make-a-dinar merchant Salmoneus, a character originating on Hercules:  The Legendary Journeys and making occasional crossovers to sister show Xena:  Warrior Princess. He appeared in the 2016 Coen Brothers film Hail, Caesar!, playing opposite Josh Brolin.

Theatre
A recent project for the theatre is a one-man show called "The Return of Brother Theodore".  The Los Angeles Weekly gave the show its prized "GO" recommendation and said, "actor Robert Trebor reincarnates Gottlieb in a 45-minute late-night solo performance that paints Brother Theodore’s belligerent reflections on a twisted life with broad yet powerful comedic strokes." This production was nominated by The LA Weekly for Best Solo Performance of 2007. 
Trebor starred as the Russian Major Viktor Davidykov in the drama Ravensridge written by TS Cook. Mr. Cook was the writer of the aforementioned Out Of The Darkness produced in 1985.  His work in this play has been widely praised, Variety saying "Trebor is superb as the acerbic Davidykov, ironically bemoaning, "We used to be such a beautiful police state," and then affectingly describing how for all of communism's faults, how important it was that the whole country was experiencing it together. Trebor's Russian accent is excellent, and his perf is multilayered and nimble."

Author
He wrote the critically acclaimed satiric novella The Haircut Who Would Be King, that Kirkus said was "A hilarious rendering of the contemporary political scene." Bookpleasures.com wrote, "This is a parody at its supreme best; uproariously funny yet accurate. If you are feeling down from the bombardment of the daily outrageous behavior of the idiot in the White House, the read will provide you with just the right medicine to cure your ills and put away those anti-depressants that you may be taking."

Filmography
Face of Fire (1959)
Magnum Force (1973) - Reporter (uncredited)
Gorp (1980) - Rabbi Blowitz
The First Time (1983) - Joel
Turk 182 (1985) - Copy Boy
The Purple Rose of Cairo (1985) - Reporter
The Sex O'Clock News (1985) - Mr. Rajah
Out of the Darkness (1985) (TV) - David Berkowitz
52 Pick-Up (1986) - Leo Franks
Making Mr. Right (1987) - Tux Salesman
My Demon Lover (1987) - Charles
Talk Radio (1988) - Jeffrey Fisher / Francine
Universal Soldier (1992) - Motel Owner
The Nutt House (1992) - Buddy
Hercules and the Lost Kingdom (1994) (TV) - Waylin
The Shadow (1994) - Harried Man in Taxi (uncredited)
Hercules: The Legendary Journeys (1995–1999) (TV series) - Salmoneus / B.S. Hollingsfoffer, Studio Head
Xena: Warrior Princess (1995–2001) (TV series) - Salmoneus / Marco / Lord Seltzer
Dying on the Edge (2001) - Mel Weiner
Wedding Daze (2004) (TV) - Rabbi Feldman
Jiminy Glick in Lalawood (2004) - Jay Schiffer
Raise Your Voice (2004) - Mr. Wesson
Meet Market (2004) - Director Dick
The Devil's Rejects (2005) - Marty Walker (uncredited)
Hail, Caesar! (2016) - Producer of 'Hail, Caesar!'

References

External links

"The Return of Brother Theodore" A one-man theatrical tribute starring Robert Trebor

1953 births
Living people
American male film actors
American male television actors
American people of Jewish descent
Male actors from Philadelphia